Lee Camp may refer to:

Lee Camp (comedian) (born 1980), American comedian
Lee Camp (footballer) (born 1984), Northern Ireland footballer

See also
Lees Camp (disambiguation)